Marion 6360, also known as The Captain, was a giant power shovel built by the Marion Power Shovel company. Completed in 1965, it was one of the largest land vehicles ever built, exceeded only by some dragline and bucket-wheel excavators. The shovel originally started work with Southwestern Illinois Coal Corporation, but the owners were soon bought out by Arch Coal. Everything remained the same at the mine except for the colors which were changed to red, white, and blue.

The shovel worked well for Arch Coal until September 9, 1991, when a fire broke out in the lower works of the shovel. It was caused by a burst hydraulic line that was spraying the hot fluids on an electrical relay panel. This fire caused a great deal of damage to both the lower works and machine house. Afterwards, engineers from both Arch and Marion Power Shovel surveyed the damage and deemed it too great to repair, and the machine was scrapped one year later in the last pit it dug. 

The only Marion shovel that compared (in size and scope) to "The Captain" was the Marion 5960-M Power Shovel that worked at Peabody Coal Company's (Peabody Energy) River Queen Surface Mine in Central City, Kentucky. It was named the "Big Digger" and carried a  bucket on a  boom. It was Marion Power Shovel's second largest machine ever built and the third largest shovel in the world. This "sister shovel" was scrapped in early 1990 in Muhlenberg County, Kentucky.

Specifics
 Boom Length: 
 Bucket Capacity:  (double doors)
 Dipper Stick Length: 
 Overall Weight: 12,700 tons
 Total Height: 
 Crawler Height: 
 Crawler Unit Length: 
 Individual Crawler Width: 
 Individual Track weight: 3.5 tons apiece (42 pads per track total)
 Clearance Under Shovel:  to the first level of the Lower Works
 Largest Shovel In The World & Largest Ever Built By Marion--
 Started Service: 1965
 Dismantled: 1992 
 Power 15,000 hp
 Build time (site erection) 18 months & 150,000 man hours

See also
 Bagger 288
 MAN Takraf RB293
 Big Muskie
 The Silver Spade
 Big Brutus
 Bucyrus-Erie
 Bucket-wheel excavator
 Dragline
 Excavator
 Power Shovel

References

External links
 

Stripping shovels
Engineering vehicles
6360